Truro Township is one of the seventeen townships of Franklin County, Ohio, United States.  The 2010 census found 26,837 people in the township, 1,304 of whom lived in the unincorporated portions of the township.

Geography
Located in the eastern part of the county, it borders the following cities and townships:
Jefferson Township - north
Pataskala - northeast
Etna Township - east
Liberty Township - southeast
Madison Township - south
Columbus - west

Most of what was once Truro Township has been annexed by the cities of Reynoldsburg, in the east, and Columbus everywhere else, although the village of Brice is located in southern Truro Township, and several small unincorporated portions remain.

Name and history
It is the only Truro Township statewide.

Truro Township owes its name to Truro, Nova Scotia, the former hometown of the Taylor family of early settlers, who came to Ohio encouraged by the United States Congress to begin a new life in the Refugee Tract after having their estates seized by the British government for supporting the American Revolution.

Government
The township is governed by a three-member board of trustees, who are elected in November of odd-numbered years to a four-year term beginning on the following January 1. Two are elected in the year after the presidential election and one is elected in the year before it. There is also an elected township fiscal officer, who serves a four-year term beginning on April 1 of the year after the election, which is held in November of the year before the presidential election. Vacancies in the fiscal officership or on the board of trustees are filled by the remaining trustees.

Services

The township provides fire and EMS protection for the city of Reynoldsburg, the village of Brice as well as the unincorporated areas of the township. They also provide road maintenance in the unincorporated areas of the township and operate Silent Home Cemetery in Reynoldsburg.

Notable residents
Congressman Edward Taylor (1869-1938), grandson of early settler David Taylor.

References

External links
Township website
County website

Townships in Franklin County, Ohio
Townships in Ohio